Frank Michael Reich Jr.  (born December 4, 1961) is an American football coach and former quarterback who is the head coach for the Carolina Panthers of the National Football League (NFL). He played college football at Maryland and was selected by the Bills in the third round of the 1985 NFL Draft. Reich spent most of his career backing up Jim Kelly, although he achieved recognition when he led the Bills to the NFL's largest postseason comeback during the 1992–93 NFL playoffs.

After retiring as a player, Reich began an NFL coaching career. Holding assistant positions from 2008 to 2017, he was the offensive coordinator for the Philadelphia Eagles when they won their first Super Bowl title in Super Bowl LII. He served as the head coach of the Indianapolis Colts from 2018 to 2022 and guided the team to two playoff appearances.

Playing career

High school years
Reich, who is of German descent, attended Cedar Crest High School in Lebanon, Pennsylvania where he played baseball, football, and basketball. Reich started on the football team for his last two years in high school. He played quarterback in the Big 33 Football Classic in 1980 following his senior year of high school.

College career
Reich was accepted to the University of Maryland on an athletic scholarship, and played for the Maryland Terrapins football team as backup to starter Boomer Esiason for three years, as well as his roommate.

The biggest highlight of Reich's college career was the comeback he led against the Miami Hurricanes on November 10, 1984 at the Miami Orange Bowl. Reich came off the bench to play for Stan Gelbaugh, who had previously replaced him as the starter after Reich separated his shoulder in the fourth week of the season against Wake Forest. Quarterback Bernie Kosar had led Miami to a 31–0 halftime lead. At the start of the third quarter, Reich led the Terrapins on multiple scoring drives. Three touchdowns in the third quarter and a fourth at the start of the final quarter turned what was a blowout into a close game. With Miami leading 34–28, Reich hit Greg Hill with a 68-yard touchdown pass, which deflected off the hands of Miami safety Darrell Fullington to take the lead. Maryland scored once more to cap a 42–9 second half, and won 42–40, completing what was then the biggest comeback in NCAA history.

National Football League
Reich was drafted by the Buffalo Bills in the third round (57th overall) in the 1985 NFL Draft. The Bills had already drafted future Hall of Famer Jim Kelly in 1983 and when Kelly signed with the Bills in 1986, Reich was relegated a role as backup.

Reich got his first start when Kelly went down with a shoulder injury in 1989. Reich led the Bills to two straight victories. He rallied the Bills in the fourth quarter by throwing two drives down the field for a 23–20 victory over the previously unbeaten Los Angeles Rams. This first game for Reich occurred in front of a Rich Stadium crowd of 76,231 and a Monday Night Football audience. In Super Bowl XXV, kicker Scott Norwood famously missed the potential game winning field goal wide-right. 

Reich returned the following year, however when Kelly was injured again late in the 1990 season. Reich provided the Bills with two key wins, clinching them the AFC East title and home field advantage throughout the playoffs.

During the final game of the 1992 regular season, the Houston Oilers defeated Buffalo 27–3 in Houston, where Kelly suffered strained ligaments in his knee and yielded to Reich to finish the game in his place. With Kelly out, Reich took the reins as the starter for the wild card game the following week, on January 3, 1993. The wild card game was a rematch with the Oilers, hosted in Buffalo, where they led the Bills 35–3 early in the 3rd quarter, but Reich then led the Bills on a 38–3 run en route to a 41–38 overtime victory. The rally from a 32-point deficit remained the largest comeback in NFL history until the Minnesota Vikings made a 33-point comeback against the Indianapolis Colts on December 17, 2022. Reich started his second consecutive playoff game, as the Bills defeated the Pittsburgh Steelers 24–3 in the divisional round. This made Reich one of a handful of quarterbacks who is undefeated as a starter in post-season play, as well as the only one with more than one start to his credit. Kelly recovered and started the AFC Championship where the Bills defeated the Miami Dolphins 29–10. During Super Bowl XXVII, the Bills faced the Dallas Cowboys and Reich again replaced an injured Kelly in the first half of the Super Bowl. Reich led the Bills to 10 points to make the score 31–17, with a possible comeback well within the Bills' capability as the 3rd quarter concluded. However, in the 4th quarter, the Cowboys scored 21 unanswered points to win 52–17, and Reich finished the game with two interceptions.

After giving the Bills one more comeback victory late in the 1993 NFL season, Reich signed with the expansion Carolina Panthers in March 1995 to start off their first year. He threw the first touchdown pass in franchise history to former Bills player Pete Metzelaars in Memorial Stadium in Clemson, as Bank of America Stadium was still under construction. The Panthers had drafted Kerry Collins as their intended franchise quarterback, but Reich was the starter for the first three games until Collins was deemed ready to take the starting job. He was sacked 9 times on September 3 at Atlanta, a franchise record he shares with Cam Newton.

Reich was then signed by the New York Jets where he started for seven games in 1996.

In 1997, Reich signed with the Detroit Lions, reuniting him with his coach at Maryland, Bobby Ross. Reich appeared in 6 games in 1997, all in relief, and 6 games in 1998, including 2 starts. Reich retired following the 1998 NFL season.

In 2014, Pro Football Hall of Fame Executive Bill Polian, who was general manager of the Bills when they drafted Reich, called him "the greatest backup quarterback in NFL history."

Coaching career

Indianapolis Colts
Reich was a coaching intern for the Indianapolis Colts from 2006 to 2007. In 2008, he served as an offensive coaching staff assistant for the Colts. After Tony Dungy retired following the 2008 season, former Colts quarterback coach Jim Caldwell took over as head coach and Reich became the new quarterbacks coach.  Reich switched to wide receivers coach in 2011 but was dismissed when the entire coaching staff was released after a 2–14 season.

Arizona Cardinals
Reich was the wide receivers coach for the Arizona Cardinals in 2012 under head coach Ken Whisenhunt, but along with Whisenhunt and other offensive coaches, was dismissed on December 31, 2012. Reich would not be retained under new head coach Bruce Arians.

San Diego Chargers
Reich was hired by the San Diego Chargers, along with Whisenhunt, in 2013. When Whisenhunt left to become head coach of the Tennessee Titans, Reich was promoted to offensive coordinator. On January 4, 2016, he was fired from his position as offensive coordinator after the Chargers finished 31st in rushing and struggled on offense.

Philadelphia Eagles
On January 20, 2016, Reich was hired as the offensive coordinator for the Philadelphia Eagles He went on to win Super Bowl LII over the New England Patriots with the team in the 2017 season.

Return to Indianapolis
On February 11, 2018, he was named the new head coach of the Colts, seven years after he had been fired as wide receivers coach.

After losing his first career game against the Cincinnati Bengals, Reich earned his first win as a head coach over the Washington Redskins. In Week 3 against his former team the Eagles, with the Colts down 20–16 with seconds left in the game, Reich pulled starting quarterback Andrew Luck and put in Jacoby Brissett to attempt a Hail Mary pass from his own 46-yard line. Brissett overthrew several players in the back of the end zone and the Colts lost the game. The move was questioned by some journalists and fans, and led to some speculation about the health of Luck's shoulder, although Reich and Luck both said it was purely because Brissett had a stronger throwing arm. The following week against the Houston Texans, Luck led the Colts back from down 28–10 in the third quarter, including a game-tying two point conversion with :51 left, however the team lost in overtime, 37–34. Reich was the center of controversy after Indianapolis failed to convert a 4th and 4 on their own 43 and the Texans kicked the game-winning field goal, although he afterward said "I'll just address it now. We're not playing to tie. We're going for it 10 times out of 10." After a 1–5 start, Reich led the Colts to a 10–6 record winning nine of their final 10 games.

Indianapolis became just the third team in NFL history to make the playoffs following a 1–5 start, and also reached their first postseason appearance since 2014. In the Wild Card Round,  they defeated the Houston Texans 21–7 before falling to the Kansas City Chiefs 31–13 in the Divisional Round.

Following Luck's unexpected retirement ahead of the 2019 season, Reich's Indianapolis tenure became noted for quarterback instability, with the team starting Brissett in 2019, Philip Rivers in 2020, Carson Wentz in 2021, and Matt Ryan and Sam Ehlinger in 2022. After a disappointing 3–5–1 start to the 2022 season, Reich was fired on November 7.

Carolina Panthers
On January 26, 2023, the Carolina Panthers hired Reich as their next head coach.

Head coaching record

Personal life
Reich's German American father, Frank, played for the Penn State Nittany Lions from 1953 to 1955 as a center and linebacker. He was drafted by the Philadelphia Eagles in the 14th round of the 1956 NFL Draft, but did not play in the National Football League. Frank Reich Sr. was a teacher in technology education and also a football coach at Lebanon High School, retiring in 1992.

Throughout Reich's NFL career, he remained a devout Christian. He is a motivational speaker utilizing the great comebacks and the importance of God as a main keynote of his speeches. He credits the song "In Christ Alone" by Michael English as his inspiration. Reich attended the Charlotte Campus of Reformed Theological Seminary in Charlotte and he earned a Master of Divinity degree. He served as president of RTS' Charlotte campus from 2003 to 2006. Reich was also a pastor at Ballantyne Presbyterian until he moved to Indianapolis.

Reich and his wife Linda have three daughters.

References

External links
 Carolina Panthers profile
 

1961 births
American people of German descent
American football quarterbacks
American Presbyterian ministers
Arizona Cardinals coaches
Buffalo Bills players
Carolina Panthers head coaches
Carolina Panthers players
Coaches of American football from Pennsylvania
Detroit Lions players
Indianapolis Colts coaches
Indianapolis Colts head coaches
Living people
Maryland Terrapins football players
National Football League offensive coordinators
New York Jets players
People from Lebanon County, Pennsylvania
People from Long Island
Philadelphia Eagles coaches
Players of American football from Pennsylvania
Players of American football from Charlotte, North Carolina
Presidents of Calvinist and Reformed seminaries
Sportspeople from Charlotte, North Carolina